Lula is a comune (municipality) in the Province of Nuoro in the Italian region Sardinia, located about  north of the regional capital Cagliari and about  northeast of the provincial capital Nuoro.  

Lula is located on the bottom of Mount Albo, a  chain of white limestone, with numerous natural caves and stalactites.
 
Lula borders the following municipalities: Bitti, Dorgali, Galtellì, Irgoli, Loculi, Lodè, Onanì, Orune, Siniscola.

References

Cities and towns in Sardinia